The Canadian Trucking Alliance (CTA) is a Canadian federation of provincial trucking associations. They represent approximately 4,500 carriers, owner-operators, and industry suppliers.  The CTA's head office is in Toronto with provincial association offices in Vancouver, Calgary, Regina, Winnipeg, Montreal, and Moncton.

History
On January 22, 2022, the CTA announced that it “strongly disapproves” of the Freedom Convoy of trucks heading to Ottawa as a protest against COVID-19 vaccine mandates in the industry.  Some truckers participating in the protest might be represented by CTA in the trucking industry concerning legislation.

References

Transport companies of Canada
Trucking companies of the United States
Publicly traded companies of Canada